The 2016 CS U.S. International Figure Skating Classic was a senior international figure skating competition held in September 2016 in Salt Lake City, Utah. It was part of the 2016–17 ISU Challenger Series. Medals were awarded in the disciplines of men's singles, ladies' singles, pair skating, and ice dancing.

Entries
The International Skating Union published the list of entries on August 31, 2016.

Withdrew before starting orders were drawn
 Men: Yan Han (CHN), Michal Březina (CZE)
 Ladies: Anastasia Galustyan (ARM), Brooklee Han (AUS), Véronik Mallet (CAN), Maisy Hiu Ching Ma (HKG), Byun Ji-hyun (KOR), Michaela du Toit (RSA)
 Pairs: Kirsten Moore-Towers / Michael Marinaro (CAN), Kim Kyu-eun / Alex Kang-chan Kam (KOR)
 Ice dancing: Laurence Fournier Beaudry / Nikolaj Sørensen (DEN)

Challenger Series results

Men
Jason Brown rose from second place after the short program to win the title, with Takahito Mura and Adam Rippon taking silver and bronze respectively.

Ladies
Satoko Miyahara led the ladies short program with 70.09 points, followed by Mariah Bell with 60.64 points, and South Korea's Choi Da-bin with 58.70 points. In the free program, Miyahara held on to her lead and scored 136.66 points, while Bell kept her second position with 123.58 points. Karen Chen of the United States rose from sixth in the short program to third in the free skating with 110.58 points. Overall, Miyahara won with a combined score of 206.75, Bell second with 184.22, and Chen third with 162.08.

Choi Da-bin, third after the short, finished fourth overall with a free skate where she fell twice. She had a combined score of 152.99. The last two Americans Paige Rydberg and Emily Chan finished fifth and sixth, respectively.

Pairs
Second after the short program, Canada's Brittany Jones / Joshua Reagan overtook the United States' Jessica Calalang / Zack Sidhu for the gold medal.

Ice dancing
Madison Hubbell / Zachary Donohue of the United States took gold after winning both segments of the competition. Silver medalists Kana Muramoto / Chris Reed of Japan received their first CS medal after placing second in both segments. Canada's Alexandra Paul / Mitchell Islam climbed from fifth to take the bronze medal.

References

External links
 , Results
 2016 U.S. International Figure Skating Classic at the International Skating Union

2010s in Salt Lake City
2016
2016 in figure skating
2016 in sports in Utah
Sports in Salt Lake City
September 2016 sports events in the United States